Richard Nord is an American film editor. He is best known for his work on The Fugitive (1993), which earned him Academy Award, ACE Eddie Award, and British Academy Film Award nominations.

Partial filmography

The Last Full Measure (2019)
Nancy Drew and the Hidden Staircase (2019)
Beyond the Sky (2018)
ZBurbs (2017)
Alex & the List (2017)
Replace (2017)
Shattered (2017)
Vendetta (2015)
Walking with the Enemy (2013)
10 Rules for Sleeping Around (2013)
There Be Dragons (2011)
Preacher's Kid (2010)
Sex and Lies in Sin City (2008)
You and I (2008)
Captivity (2007)
.45 (2006)
American Gun (2005)
Aurora Borealis (2005)
Sawtooth (2004)
The Battle of Shaker Heights (2003)
11:14 (2003)
Two Weeks Notice (2002)
Joshua (2002)
The Feast of All Saints (2001)
The Jennie Project (2001)
The Color of Friendship (2000)
The Watcher (2000)
The Rage: Carrie 2 (1999)
Body Count (1998)
Species II (1998)
Phat Beach (1996)
Fled (1996)
Getting Away with Murder (1996)
Pentathlon (1994)
Renaissance Man (1994)
The Fugitive (1993)
Passenger 57 (1992)
A Fine Romance (1991)
Strictly Business (1991)
Working Girl (1988)
Biloxi Blues (1988)
Nadine (1987)
Making Mr. Right (1987)
Heartburn (1986)
Hannah and Her Sisters (1986)
The Purple Rose of Cairo (1985)
Broadway Danny Rose (1984)
Zelig (1983)
A Midsummer Night's Sex Comedy (1982)
Wolfen (1981)

Awards and nominations

References

External links
 

Living people
American film editors
Queens College, City University of New York alumni
Tisch School of the Arts alumni
Year of birth missing (living people)
Place of birth missing (living people)